Artificial leather, also called synthetic leather, is a material intended to substitute for leather in upholstery, clothing, footwear, and other uses where a leather-like finish is desired but the actual material is cost prohibitive or unsuitable, or for ethical concerns. Artificial leather is known under many names, including leatherette, imitation leather, faux leather, vegan leather, PU leather, and pleather.

Manufacture

Many different methods for the manufacture of imitation leathers have been developed.  

A current method is to use an embossed release paper known as casting paper as a form for the surface finish, often mimicking the texture of top-grain leather.  This embossed release paper holds the final texture in negative.  For the manufacture, the release paper is coated with several layers of plastic e.g. pvc or polyurethane, possibly including a surface finish, a colour layer, a foam layer, an adhesive, a fabric layer, a reverse finish.  Depending on the specific process, these layers may be wet or partially cured at the time of integration.  The artificial leather is cured, then the release paper is removed and possibly reused.

A fermentation method of making collagen, the main chemical in real leather, is under development.

Historical methods 

One of the earliest artificial leathers was Presstoff. Invented in 19th century Germany, it was made of specially layered and treated paper pulp. It gained its widest use in Germany during the Second World War in place of leather, which under wartime conditions was rationed. Presstoff could be used in almost every application normally filled by leather, excepting items like footwear that were repeatedly subjected to flex wear or moisture. Under these conditions, Presstoff tends to delaminate and lose cohesion.

Another early example was Rexine, a leathercloth fabric produced in the United Kingdom by Rexine Ltd of Hyde, near Manchester. It was made of cloth surfaced with a mixture of nitrocellulose, camphor oil, alcohol, and pigment, embossed to look like leather. It was used as a bookbinding material and upholstery covering, especially for the interiors of motor vehicles and the interiors of railway carriages produced by British manufacturers beginning in the 1920s, its cost being around a quarter that of leather.

Poromerics are made from a plastic coating (usually a polyurethane) on a fibrous base layer (typically a polyester). The term poromeric was coined by DuPont as a derivative of the terms porous and polymeric. The first poromeric material was DuPont's Corfam, introduced in 1963 at the Chicago Shoe Show. Corfam was the centerpiece of the DuPont pavilion at the 1964 New York World's Fair in New York City. After spending millions of dollars marketing the product to shoe manufacturers, DuPont withdrew Corfam from the market in 1971 and sold the rights to a company in Poland.

Leatherette is also made by covering a fabric base with a plastic. The fabric can be made of natural or synthetic fiber which is then covered with a soft polyvinyl chloride (PVC) layer. Leatherette is used in bookbinding and was common on the casings of 20th century cameras.

Cork leather is a natural-fiber alternative made from the bark of cork oak trees that has been compressed, similar to Presstoff.

Environmental effect 
The production of the PVC used in the production of many artificial leathers requires a plasticizer called a phthalate to make it flexible and soft. PVC requires petroleum and large amounts of energy thus making it reliant on fossil fuels. During the production process carcinogenic byproducts, dioxins, are produced which are toxic to humans and animals. Dioxins remain in the environment long after PVC is manufactured. When PVC ends up in a landfill it does not decompose like genuine leather and can release dangerous chemicals into the water and soil.

Polyurethane is currently more popular for use than PVC.

The production of some artificial leathers requires plastic, with others only requiring plant-based materials; the inclusion of artificial materials in the production of artificial leathers notably raises sustainability issues. However, some reports state that the manufacture of artificial leather is still more sustainable than that of real leather, with the Environmental Profit & Loss, a sustainability report developed in 2018 by Kering, stating that the impact of vegan-leather production can be up to a third lower than real leather.

Uses
Artificial leathers are often used in clothing fabrics, furniture upholstery, water craft upholstery, and automotive interiors. 

Depending on the construction, the artificial leather may be porous and breathable, or may be impermeable and waterproof. 

Porous artificial leather with a non-woven microfibre backing is a popular choice for clothing, and is comfortable to wear.

One of its primary advantages, especially in cars, is that it requires little maintenance in comparison to leather, and does not crack or fade easily, though the surface of some artificial leathers may rub and wear off with time.

Brand names 

 Alcantara
 Clarino: manufactured by Kuraray Co., Ltd. of Japan.
 Fabrikoid: A DuPont brand, cotton cloth coated with nitrocellulose
 Kirza: A Russian form developed in the 1930s consisting of cotton fabric, latex, and rosin
 MB-Tex: Used in many Mercedes-Benz base trims
 MuSkin: Made from a shelf fungus (Phellinus ellipsoideus) that is treated to become water resistant
 Naugahyde: An American brand introduced by Uniroyal
 Piñatex: Made from pineapple leaves
 Rexine: A British brand
 Skai: Made by the German company Konrad Hornschuch AG, its name has become a genericized trademark in Germany and surrounding countries

See also
 Bicast leather – a form of genuine leather coated with a plastic finish
 Bonded leather – a material made by blending scrap leather fibers with a plastic binder
 Microfiber – a material made with synthetic fibers thinner than natural silk; can be used for making synthetic suedes, like Ultrasuede
Mycelium-based materials - Mycelium, the fungal equivalent of roots in plants, has been identified as an ecologically friendly substitute to a litany of materials throughout different industries.

References

Further reading
 Faux Real: Genuine Leather and 200 Years of Inspired Fakes, by Robert Kanigel. Joseph Henry Press, 2007.

External links
 

 
Sustainability
Nonwoven fabrics
Synthetic materials
Leather
Textiles
Fashion design